Tariq Woolen (born May 2, 1999) is an American football cornerback for the Seattle Seahawks of the National Football League (NFL). He played college football at UTSA and was drafted by the Seahawks in the fifth round of the 2022 NFL Draft.

Early life and high school
Woolen grew up in Fort Worth, Texas and attended Arlington Heights High School. He was rated a three-star recruit and committed to play college football at the University of Texas at San Antonio over offers from North Texas, Houston, and Texas State.

College career
Woolen redshirted his freshman season at UTSA. As a redshirt freshman wide receiver, he caught 15 passes for 158 yards and one touchdown. Woolen started the first three games of his redshirt sophomore season before moving to the cornerback position. 

Woolen became a starter during his redshirt junior season and finished the year with 35 tackles, 2.5 tackles for loss, and 1.5 sacks with four passes broken up and one interception. Woolen had 25 tackles, 5 passes broken up, and one interception as a redshirt senior. After the conclusion of his college career, Woolen was invited to play in the 2022 Senior Bowl.

Professional career
At the 2022 NFL Combine, Woolen ran a 4.26-second 40-yard dash, tied for third-best in the Combine history and fastest for a player over six foot. He was selected by the Seattle Seahawks in the fifth round (153rd overall) of the 2022 NFL Draft.

In Week 3, Woolen recorded his first career interception from Atlanta Falcons quarterback Marcus Mariota as time expired in the second half. In Week 4, Woolen had his second career interception against Detroit Lions quarterback Jared Goff and returned it 40 yards for a touchdown in the 48–45 win. After intercepting Kyler Murray in Week 6, Woolen became the only rookie over the last 10 years to record an interception in at least four consecutive games. He finished his rookie season with a total of 6 interceptions, tied for most in the league.

NFL career statistics

References

External links
 Seattle Seahawks bio
 UTSA Roadrunners bio

1999 births
American football cornerbacks
Living people
Seattle Seahawks players
Players of American football from Fort Worth, Texas
UTSA Roadrunners football players
National Conference Pro Bowl players